George Edward Bruns (July 3, 1914 – May 23, 1983) was an American composer of music for film and television. His accolades include four Academy Award nominations, and three Grammy Award nominations. He is mainly known for his compositions for numerous Disney films spanning from the 1950s until the 1970s, among them Sleeping Beauty (1959), One Hundred and One Dalmatians, The Absent-Minded Professor (both 1961), The Sword in the Stone (1963), The Jungle Book (1967), The Love Bug (1968), The Aristocats (1970), and Robin Hood (1973).

A native of Sandy, Oregon, Bruns began playing piano at age six. After graduating from Oregon State University, he worked as a bandleader at the Multnomah Hotel in Portland before relocating to Los Angeles to further pursue a musical career. In 1953, Bruns was hired as a musical arranger at Walt Disney Studios, eventually going on to become the studio's music director, a role he served from the mid 1950s until his retirement in 1976.

Over the course of his career, Bruns was nominated for four Academy Awards for his work on Disney films, including Scoring of a Musical Picture for Sleeping Beauty and Babes in Toyland (1961), and Best Adaptation or Treatment for The Sword in the Stone. He received his fourth, final and only nomination for Best Original Song for the track "Love" from Robin Hood.

Bruns spent his later years in his native Oregon, composing music and instructing at Lewis & Clark College. He died in Portland in 1983 of a heart attack. In 2001, he was posthumously inducted as a Disney Legend.

Biography

Early life
George Edward Bruns was born on July 3, 1914, in Sandy, Oregon one of three children born to Augusta (née Weyer) and Edward Bruns. He had one older and one younger sister. His father was a lumber mill proprietor, and built the first lumber mill on Mount Hood, which was eventually relocated to Sandy. Bruns expressed interest in music at an early age: He began playing piano at age six, and subsequently learned how to play the bass tuba. He eventually became proficient in 15 different instruments, and began performing with a high school band while still in elementary school.

He attended and graduated from Sandy High School, and went on to study engineering at  Oregon State University, where he was a member of Lambda Chi Alpha fraternity. In the 1930s he worked as a musician with various groups in the Portland, Oregon, area, and also performed in a traveling band. In 1946 he was appointed musical director at radio station KEX in Portland, and also was the bandleader for the Rose Bowl room of the Multnomah Hotel. From 1947 to 1949 he performed and recorded on trombone with Portland's Castle Jazz Band, led by banjoist Monte Ballou.

Career with Walt Disney
In the late 1940s, he moved to Los Angeles, where he did studio work, performed, and recorded with trombonist Turk Murphy's Jazz Band. In 1953, he was hired by Walt Disney as an arranger, eventually becoming Disney's musical director, a position he held until his retirement in 1976. Despite his retirement, he continued to work on Disney projects.

During the mid-1950s in 1953 at the Disney Studio, his first assignment was when he composed and adapted the music from Tchaikovsky's Sleeping Beauty ballet for use as background score in the 1959 Disney film version. In addition to composing live action films such as The Absent-Minded Professor and Babes in Toyland, Bruns went on to compose the scores for One Hundred and One Dalmatians, The Sword in the Stone, The Jungle Book, The Aristocats, and Robin Hood. Bruns also provided Herbie the Love Bug with his sprightly theme song, featured prominently throughout the series. Among his other works include the song "Yo Ho (A Pirate's Life for Me)" (which he co-wrote with Xavier Atencio) from the Disney theme park attraction Pirates of the Caribbean and later used in the film series based on that ride, "The Ballad of Davy Crockett" with Tom W. Blackburn, the title song from the 1956 Humphrey the Bear cartoon In the Bag, and the song "Love" with Floyd Huddleston from Robin Hood.

During his tenure with Disney Studios, Bruns continued to play dixieland jazz, leading his Wonderland Jazz Band on two recording sessions, and playing and recording occasionally with the Disney "house" band, the Firehouse Five Plus Two.

Retirement and later years
Bruns retired from Disney in 1976 and left California, returning to his native Sandy, Oregon. He instructed music part-time at Lewis & Clark College and continued to perform and compose, including recording at least one locally distributed album of jazz.

Death
Bruns died of a heart attack on May 23, 1983, in Portland, Oregon. He had also suffered from diabetes in his later life. He was survived by his wife, Dorothy Colclough, and their six children. Bruns was cremated, and a service was held at the Chapel of the Hills in Wemme, Oregon. He was interred at Fir Hill Cemetery in Clackamas County. Bruns was named a Disney Legend in 2001.

Selected film scores
All films produced by Walt Disney Productions except where noted.

 Produced and released by Paramount Pictures

Accolades

References

External links

George Bruns profile  from the Oregon State University alumni association

1914 births
1983 deaths
20th-century American composers
20th-century American male musicians
20th-century jazz composers
American film score composers
American jazz bandleaders
American jazz composers
American jazz double-bassists
American jazz pianists
American jazz trombonists
American male film score composers
American male jazz composers
American television composers
Animated film score composers
Dixieland jazz musicians
Firehouse Five Plus Two members
Jazz musicians from Oregon
Lewis & Clark College faculty
Music directors
Musicians from Portland, Oregon
Oregon State University alumni
People from Sandy, Oregon
Walt Disney Animation Studios people